Sir Kenneth Carmichael Macdonald, KCB (born 1930) is a retired British civil servant and businessman. Educated at the University of Glasgow, he served in the Royal Air Force for two years before entering the civil service in 1954 as an official in the Air Ministry. After three years at HM Treasury, he was moved to the Ministry of Defence (MoD) in 1965. Promoted to deputy secretary in 1980, he served as the MoD's Second Permanent Secretary from 1988 to 1990. He was then chairman of Raytheon (Europe) Ltd from 1991 to 1994 and of Raytheon Systems Ltd from 1991 to 2000.

References 

1930 births
Living people
British civil servants
British businesspeople
Alumni of the University of Glasgow
Knights Companion of the Order of the Bath